Balloniscidae is a family of crustaceans belonging to the order Isopoda.

Genera:
 Balloniscus Budde-Lund, 1908
 Plataoniscus Leistikow, 2001
 Plataoniscus Vandel, 1963

References

Isopoda